Degnan is a surname. Notable people with the surname include:

 Albert Degnan, Scottish footballer
 Georges Kablan Degnan (born 1953), Ivorian athlete
 John J. Degnan (born 1944), American politician and businessman
 Kelly C. Degnan, American diplomat
 Timothy F. Degnan (born 1940), American politician
 Tom Degnan (born 1982), American actor